Xylosma boulindae is a species of flowering plant in the family Salicaceae. It is endemic to New Caledonia.

References

boulindae
Endemic flora of New Caledonia
Vulnerable plants
Taxonomy articles created by Polbot
Taxa named by Hermann Otto Sleumer